The 110th United States Congress began on January 3, 2007. There were 10 new senators (eight Democrats, one Republican, one independent) and 54 new representatives (41 Democrats, 13 Republicans) at the start of its first session. Additionally, two senators (both Republicans) and 13 representatives (nine Democrats, four Republicans) took office on various dates in order to fill vacancies during the 110th Congress before it ended on January 3, 2009.

The representatives comprise a diverse group reflecting the multiculturalism of the United States. One representative graduated with a high school class of 25; another is said to have a net worth of $50 million. Backgrounds include teachers, musicians, authors, engineers, a vice admiral, and a professional football player. Religions include Christianity, Buddhism, Judaism, and Islam (none claims to be atheist or agnostic). When taking office, ages ranged from 33 to 66, placing the class mostly in the baby boomer and generation X categories. Of this group 12 are female.

Senate

Took office January 3, 2007

Took office during the 110th Congress

House of Representatives

Took office January 3, 2007

Took office during the 110th Congress

See also
List of United States senators in the 110th Congress
List of members of the United States House of Representatives in the 110th Congress by seniority

Notes

Freshman class members
110